The 1935 season of the Primera División Peruana was the 20th season of top-flight Peruvian football. A total of 5 teams competed in this league. The national champions were Sport Boys. Matches were not completed; Sport Boys was declared champion, as no team could reach them. No team was relegated as First Division grew to 10 teams. From 1931 until 1942 the points system was W:3, D:2, L:1, walkover:0.

Teams

Results

Standings

External links 
 Peru 1935 season at RSSSF
 Peruvian Football League News 

Peru1
Peruvian Primera División seasons
1935 in Peruvian football